The Labor Day Classic is an annual American football "classic" which features Texas Southern University and Prairie View A&M University, two of Texas' largest historically black universities on Labor Day weekend.  It is played at the BBVA Compass Stadium in Houston or in the New Panther Stadium in  Prairie View, Texas, depending on the hosting team. The classic is always the first matchup between two SWAC teams of the football season.

The first game between the two schools was in 1947.  However, the classic began in 1985.  In 1990, Texas Southern played and defeated the Hampton University Pirates since Prairie View A&M did not field a football team that year.

The schools compete for the Durley-Nicks Trophy named after the two most legendary coaches from both schools.  Alexander Durley is the winningest head football coach in Texas Southern football history.  Billy Nicks, Sr. won five mythical black college national championships (last being in 1968) as head coach at Prairie View A&M.

The classic is accompanied by a fellowship luncheon/press conference hosted by The Touchdown Club of Houston, a golf tournament, pep rallies, tailgating, various social mixers, and a highly anticipated battle of the bands on Friday and Saturday night between Texas Southern's Ocean of Soul and Prairie View's Marching Storm.

The 2017 Labor Day Classic was postponed because of the effects of Hurricane Harvey. The game was moved to the end of the season, joining two other games featuring SWAC teams, the Turkey Day Classic and Bayou Classic, on Thanksgiving weekend.

The 2018 Labor Day Classic was postponed to the final game of the regular season. Prairie View A&M played in the MEAC/SWAC Challenge in Atlanta, Georgia on Labor Day Weekend.

In 2020, the SWAC postponed all fall play due to the COVID-19 pandemic, which forced the Labor Day Classic to be played in March for the first time in the series.

Game results

See also  
 List of NCAA college football rivalry games
 List of black college football classics

References

College football rivalries in the United States
Texas Southern Tigers football
Prairie View A&M Panthers football
American football competitions in Houston
Black college football classics
1947 establishments in Texas